Silk Road is a 2021 American crime thriller film, written for the screen and directed by Tiller Russell based on the Rolling Stone article "Dead End on Silk Road: Internet Crime Kingpin Ross Ulbricht's Big Fall" by David Kushner. The film stars Jason Clarke, Nick Robinson, Alexandra Shipp, Jimmi Simpson, Paul Walter Hauser, Darrell Britt-Gibson, and Will Ropp. It is based on the true story of Ross Ulbricht who develops a website on the Dark net, an act which attracts the attention of the FBI and DEA who send in federal agent Richard "Rick" Bowden, a fictional composite of real life DEA Agent Carl Force and US Secret Service Special Agent Shaun Bridges, both of whom were convicted of felonies related to theft of assets in the investigation of Ulbricht, to bring down Ross' empire.

Silk Road was released in the United States on February 19, 2021 by Lionsgate.

Plot

Detailing the capture of Silk Road founder Ross Ulbricht by the FBI and DEA agent Rick Bowden, nicknamed the "Jurassic Narc."

Young, idealistic and driven to succeed, Ross Ulbricht creates Silk Road, the internet's first unregulated marketplace. When the site becomes a multimillion dollar pipeline for illicit drugs, Ulbricht draws the attention of Rick Bowden, a dangerously unpredictable DEA agent who uses any means necessary to take him down.

Cast
 Jason Clarke as Richard "Rick" Bowden aka "Jurassic Narc" 
 Nick Robinson as Ross Ulbricht
 Alexandra Shipp as Julia Vie
 Jimmi Simpson as Chris Tarbell
 Paul Walter Hauser as Curtis Clark Green
 Darrell Britt-Gibson as Rayford
 Katie Aselton as Sandy Bowden
 Lexi Rabe as Edie Bowden
 Daniel David Stewart as Max
 Will Ropp as Shields
 Jennifer Yun as FBI Agent Kim Yum
 David DeLao as Johnny Marales
 Raleigh Cain as Callie

Production
In January 2019, it was announced Jason Clarke and Nick Robinson had joined the cast of the film, with Tiller Russell directing from a screenplay he wrote. In May 2019, Cole Sprouse, Darrell Britt-Gibson and Jimmi Simpson joined the cast of the film. In June 2019, Paul Walter Hauser, Katie Aselton and Lexi Rabe joined the cast of the film. That same month, Daniel David Stewart joined the cast of the film, replacing Sprouse.

Principal photography began in June 2019 in Albuquerque, New Mexico.

Release
It was scheduled to have its world premiere at the Tribeca Film Festival on April 16, 2020. However, the festival was postponed due to the COVID-19 pandemic. In December 2020, Lionsgate acquired U.S. distribution rights to the film, and set it for a February 19, 2021, release.

Reception
Review aggregator Rotten Tomatoes gives the film a 52% approval rating based on 64 reviews, with an average rating of 5.60/10. The website's critics consensus reads: "Silk Road draws intriguing parallels between its oppositional main characters, but doesn't do quite enough to develop the story surrounding them." According to Metacritic, which sampled 11 critics and calculated a weighted average score of 41 out of 100, the film received "mixed or average reviews".

See also
 Deep Web (film)
 Ross Ulbricht

References

External links
 

2021 thriller drama films
2021 crime drama films
American crime drama films
American crime thriller films
American thriller drama films
Films about the Drug Enforcement Administration
Films about the Federal Bureau of Investigation
Films about cryptocurrencies
Films about cybercrime
Films about e-commerce
Films about the illegal drug trade
Films postponed due to the COVID-19 pandemic
Films set in 2010
Films set in 2012
Films set in 2013
Films set in Austin, Texas
Films set in Baltimore
Films set in New York (state)
Films set in Salt Lake City
Films set in San Francisco
Films set in Sydney
Films set in Utah
Films shot in New Mexico
Organized crime films based on actual events
Biographical films about drug traffickers
Films based on newspaper and magazine articles
Darknet markets
2021 crime thriller films
2020s English-language films
2020s American films